Amphidromus javanicus is a species of large-sized air-breathing tree snail, an arboreal gastropod mollusk in the family Camaenidae.

Distribution 
Java, Indonesia.

Habitat 
In trees.

References 

javanicus
Gastropods described in 1841